Kamo Station is the name of four train stations in Japan:

 Kamo Station (Fukuoka) (賀茂駅)
 Kamo Station (Kyoto) (加茂駅)
 Kamo Station (Mie) (加茂駅)
 Kamo Station (Niigata) (加茂駅)